Anatoly Aleksandrovich Yakobson (30 April 1935, Moscow — 28 September 1978, Jerusalem) was a literary critic, teacher, poet and a central figure in the human rights movement in the Soviet Union.

Biography 

Yakobson was born in an ethnical Jewish family in 1935 in Moscow. From 1953 to 1958 he studied history at the Moscow State Pedagogical Institute.

Yakobson taught literature and history at Moscow's mathematical school #2. He included writers in his teaching which did not appear on the official syllabus, such as Mikhail Bulgakov, Alexander Solzhenitsyn, Anna Akhmatova or Osip Mandelshtam. He translated works by Paul Verlaine, Théophile Gautier and Hovhannes Tumanyan, Miguel Hernández and Federico García Lorca.

Yakobson was among those who spoke up against the Sinyavsky–Daniel trial in 1966, writing an open letter to the court.

In 1968, when the interest of the KGB in Yakobson's activities became too serious, he quit his position at the school, explaining to the director that it would not be in the school's interest to have one of its teachers arrested as an anti-Soviet dissident.

Yakobson went on to become a founding member of the dissident Initiative Group on Human Rights in the USSR in 1969. He put his signature under its first Appeal to The UN Committee for Human Rights. He resigned from the group after a courier from the emigre anti-Soviet organisation NTS contacted him, mistaking him for a co-conspirator.

Yakobson became chief editor of the samizdat human rights bulletin Chronicle of Current Events after the arrest of its first editor Natalya Gorbanevskaya in December 1969. He collated the material for issues 11–27 of the Chronicle until the end of 1972.

Threatened with arrest, Yakobson emigrated to Israel with spouse Maya Ulanovskaya and son Alexander Yakobson in 1973.

In 1978 Andrei Sakharov nominated Yakobson along with seven other Soviet dissidents for the Nobel Peace Prize.

Yakobson committed suicide on September 28, 1978.

See also

 Maya Ulanovskaya
 Alexander Yakobson

References

Sources

Bibliography

Further materials 
  – documentary on Yakobson

External links 
 
 
 

1935 births
1978 suicides
Writers from Moscow
Moscow State Pedagogical University alumni
Soviet dissidents
20th-century poets
Soviet human rights activists
Russian Jews
Jewish poets
Translators to Russian
20th-century Russian translators
Suicides in Israel
Soviet emigrants to Israel